Xibusha Township (Mandarin: 西卜沙乡) is a township in Zêkog County, Huangnan Tibetan Autonomous Prefecture, Qinghai, China. In 2010, Xibusha Township had a total population of 2,827: 1,397 males and 1,430 females: 951 aged under 14, 1,742 aged between 15 and 65 and 134 aged over 65.

References 

Township-level divisions of Qinghai
Huangnan Tibetan Autonomous Prefecture